Himali is the newly formed rural municipality in Bajura District in the Sudurpashchim Province of Nepal. It was formed in March 2017, when Government of Nepal announced 744 local level units in line with the Constitution of Nepal 2015. It lies in the northern region of Bajura District and is also considered to be the remote place of this district.

History
It is formed by merging previous VDCs named Bichhiya, Rugin and ward no. 1 to 7 of Baddhu VDC. There is snowfall throughout the year in this region.

It is the second smallest rural municipality of Bajura district in terms of population. It is divided into 7 wards and the headquarter  of this newly formed municipality is situated at Dhulachaur.

Demographics
At the time of the 2011 Nepal census, Himali Rural Municipality had a population of 9,229. Of these, 95.9% spoke Nepali, 3.0% Sherpa, 0.8% Tamang, 0.1% Maithili and other languages as their first language.

In terms of ethnicity/caste, 57.5% were Chhetri, 12.3% Hill Brahmin, 9.4% Sarki, 5.3% Thakuri, 3.5% Lohar, 3.2% Bhote, 2.7% Kami, 2.3% Damai/Dholi, 1.3% other Dalit, 0.8% Tamang, 0.6% Teli, 0.5% Badi, 0.2% other Terai, 0.1% Sanyasi/Dasnami and 0.2% others.

In terms of religion, 96.0% were Hindu and 4.0% Buddhist.

References

Rural municipalities in Bajura District
Rural municipalities of Nepal established in 2017